P. leonina may refer to:
 Pelecopsis leonina, a spider species in the genus Pelecopsis and the family Linyphiidae
 Peripatopsis leonina, the Lion's Hill velvet worm, a species in the Phylum Onychophora

See also
 Leonina (disambiguation)